Endogonopsis is a poorly known fungal genus, provisionally placed in the Diplocystaceae family. A monotypic genus, it contains the single species Endogonopsis sacramentarium, known from southern Asia. It was originally described by French mycologist Roger Heim in 1966.

References

External links

Boletales
Fungi of South America
Monotypic Boletales genera